Michael Ronda Escobosa (born September 28, 1996) is a Mexican actor and singer known for his role as Poncho in Como dice el dicho and Simón Álvarez in Soy Luna.

Life and career 
Ronda was born to father Davide Ronda, who is of Italian descent, and mother Vicky Escobosa, who is Mexican. He is the middle child between older sister Alessandra and Younger brother Kevin. In 2011, he had many acting roles, such as Camilo in La fuerza del destino. He also starred in the feature films La Noche del Pirata and Bacalar, playing the roles of Dani and Santiago, respectively. He is better known for his role as Poncho in the television series Como dice el dicho. In 2016, he portrayed Simon Álvarez in the Disney Channel Latin America series Soy Luna. As of 2020, he portrays Javier Williams in the Netflix teen drama, Control Z.

Filmography

Discography

Singles

Awards and nominations

References

External links

1996 births
Living people
Male actors from Mexico City
Mexican people of Italian descent